Season 1999-00 saw Livingston compete in the Scottish First Division. They also competed in the Bell's Challenge Cup, League Cup and the Scottish Cup.

Summary
Season 1999–00 was Livingston's first season in the Scottish First Division having been promoted the previous season they finished fourth in the league. They reached the quarter final of the challenge cup, were knocked out of the League Cup in the second round and the Scottish Cup in the fourth round.

Managers
Livingston started the season under Ray Stewart and on 15 March 2000 he was sacked by the club with Jim Leishman being reappointed as manager.

Results & fixtures

First Division

Challenge Cup

League Cup

Scottish Cup

Statistics

League table

References

Livingston
Livingston F.C. seasons